Qalebi may refer to:

Qalebi-ye Olya
Qalebi-ye Sofla